Rapala dioetas is a butterfly in the family Lycaenidae. It was observed by the British naturalist William Chapman Hewitson in 1863. It is endemic to Sulawesi (Sulawesi, Sanghihe, Talaud, Banggai and Salayar).

The larva feeds on Lagerstroemia species.

References

External links
"Rapala Moore, [1881]" at Markku Savela's Lepidoptera and Some Other Life Forms'' 

Rapala (butterfly)
Butterflies described in 1863
Taxa named by William Chapman Hewitson
Butterflies of Indonesia